Wandervogel (plural: Wandervögel; English: "Wandering Bird") is the name adopted by a popular movement of German youth groups from 1896 to 1933, who protested against industrialization by going to hike in the country and commune with nature in the woods. Drawing influence from medieval wandering scholars, their ethos was to revive old Teutonic values, with a strong emphasis on German nationalism. According to historians, a major contribution of the Wandervögel was the revival of folk songs in wider German society.

The movement was divided into three main national groups: the Alt-Wandervogel, the Wandervogel eingetragener Verein (WVEV) and the Jung-Wandervogel. While the two first ones were generally respectful of traditions (family, the military, the school), the Jung-Wandervogel was more defiant and closer to revolutionary ideas. Contrary to scouting organizations, Wandervögel had spontaneously emerged outside of authority controls, and recruited their members through selection and co-option.

Wandervogel was the dominant trend in the German Youth Movement between 1901 and 1913. From 100 members in 1901, they numbered 25,000 to 40,000 adherents in 1914. At its height, the movement had 60,000–80,000 members, with 45,000 in the WVEV alone. The name, referring to a magical, free and weightless bird, can be translated either as a "bird of passage", or as a "wandering bird",—slightly different in meaning from the Zugvogel ("migratory bird").

History

Origin (1895–1900) 
In the autumn of 1895, a law student named Herman Hoffmann-Fölkersamb (1875–1955) obtained from the director of the Gymnasium of Steglitz the authorization to organize free classes of stenography. In 1896, the classes involved walks around Steglitz, and in 1897 a 15-day hike in the Harz highlands. The small group began to grow in importance, and a trek in the Rhine region was organized in 1898 with 11 participants, followed in 1899 by a long 4-week hike with around 20 schoolboys set up in Bohemia. The particular elements of the future Wandervogel were already present in these first excursions: an emphasis on group independence and the frugal way of life, an absence of traditional authority, a disdain for touristic and marked paths, and contempt for the comfort of youth hostels.

First Wandervogel (1901–1904) 
The Wandervogel was officially established on 4 November 1901 by Karl Fischer (1881–1941) in Steglitz, a suburb of Berlin, under the name "Wandervogel Committee for Schoolboy Excursions" (Wandervogel, Ausschuß für Schülerfahrten), with four of his friends; along with four writers from the city and a medical doctor. This group served as a juridical and financial patronage, and they were not involved in the movement activities, which were led by Fischer under the title of Oberbachant. The Prussian law did not allow young people to establish their own clubs or join extracurricular ones. The association was therefore presented by Fischer as a respectable hiking club to parents and Prussian citizens. A former teacher of the Steglitz Gymnasium, the reform pedagogue Ludwig Gurlitt (1855–1931) helped the movement getting officially recognized by the Prussian Ministry of Culture by leaving a favorable report. Fischer had been a fervent follower of Hoffmann-Fölkersamb, his right-hand-man during various treks, and eventually took over the leadership when Hoffmann-Fölkersamb left Berlin at the end of 1899 for a diplomatic career in Constantinople. As Fischer failed his Abitur twice, he had to wait until 1901 to completely focus on the movement, to the detriment of his studies in law and sinology. By 1903, there were already groups in Berlin, Posen, Munich, Hamburg and Lüneburg, organizing regular hikes.

The Wandervögel soon became the prominent German youth movement. It was a back-to-nature youth organization emphasizing freedom, self-responsibility, and the spirit of adventure. It quickly took a nationalistic approach, stressing Germany's Teutonic roots. Walter Laqueur indicates that the name was discovered by one of the founders—Wolf Meyen—in an inscription on a tombstone: "Wer hat euch Wandervögeln / die Wissenschaft geschenkt / dass ihr auf Land und Meeren / die Flügel sicher lenkt". Drawing influence from medieval wandering students, the newcomers were named "Scholars" and the proven ones "Bachant". Fischer introduced new manners such as the greeting "Heil", inspired by Austrian German students; musical instruments were carried out during hikes, especially the lute guitar, alongside clothing, food, and a "hiking stick".

Divisions and expansion (1904–1913) 

In June 1904, opposition led by Siegfried Copalle grew against Karl Fischer in the original Wandervogel group. They debated on social issues: abstinence from alcohol and tobacco, and if females should be allowed to join the movement as equals. As a result, the Copalle group became the Wandervogel-Steglitz, presided by Ludwig Gurlitt, while followers of Fischer founded the Alt-Wandervogel. The Wandervogel-Steglitz banned alcohol from excursions and removed the Oberbachant position in order to establish a collegial direction (Führerkollegium). It was geographically limited to the surroundings of Berlin and in 1912, the year of its dissolution, it had only 200 "members", along with 440 students who participated in the group's activities.

The Alt-Wandervogel saw itself as the only legitimate inheritor of the original movement, as it was under the responsibility of Karl Fischer, now Großbachant. But after a new leadership crisis emerged in 1905, Fischer left both the movement and Germany during the following year. He eventually came back to his home country only 15 years later. After his departure, the Alt-Wandervögel quickly abandoned the previous authoritarian structure centered around Fischer to adopt an organization closer to the Steglitz group's. It experienced from then on a strong rise in membership.
In 1907, a new crisis broke out in the Alt-Wandervogel, led by another opponent of alcohol, Ferdinand Vetter from Jena. The Vetter group eventually seceded to found the Wandervogel, Deutscher Bund für Jugendwandern (WVDB). Largely decentralized, the autonomous structures were connected via annual meetings and a common magazine. The Wandervogel DB was endorsed by cultural groups like the Dürerbund, and by German pro-temperance leagues. This wing was particularly active in the publication of folk song collections. They also tried to reunite the different Wandervogel wings under a common agenda of alcohol prohibition, the admission of girls, and the enlargement of membership to primary school students and apprentices. After several compromises—notably the autonomy of each group in the application of policies, comparable to the situation of German states in the Empire—they eventually succeeded in creating the Wandervogel eingetragener Verein, Bund für deutsches Jugendwandern (WVEV) at the end of 1912. The WVEV was joined by the Wandervogel-Steglitz in December 1912, by the WVDB in January 1913, as well as two-thirds of the Alt-Wandervögel.

The Alt-Wandervögel who chose to remain claimed to represent the tradition of Fischer, by refusing any compromise with the adult world. By 1914, they numbered 4,400 adherents, and 6,000 Scholaren. While reminding the "German nature of the Wandervogel", they let each group decide on the question of Jewish membership; the WVEV applied the same policy. In 1912, a Jewish girl was refused membership in Zittau because, it was argued, the Wandervogel was a "German movement" that had no use for Jew. One Wandervogel newspaper, Führer Zeitung, asserted that "the Wandervogel is neither a depository for old boots formerly worn by flat-footed [Jews] and stinking of garlic nor is it an object of speculation for Jewish enterprises." The readings of Paul de Lagarde, Julius Langbehn, and Houston Stewart Chamberlain were also standard among Wandervögel.

By 1910, some directors of the Alt-Wandervogel had denounced the homosexuality of their colleague Wilhelm Jansen, who eventually seceded to create the Jung-Wandervogel split group in the same year. This was the smallest of the three main Wandervogel wings, with 2,300 members in 1913. They attacked in their rhetoric the "mentally constricting" adult institutions, claiming that the purpose of the Wandervögel was to allow young people to "discuss all their wishes and values" without the interference of adults. Influenced by Hans Blüher, they dismissed the movement as too conformist and respectable, considering it had lost its soul. This situation was caused in their views by the growing influence of adults via the Council of parents and friends (Eufrat), the interventions of teachers in their activities, and a rise in membership that had become out of control. The Freideutsche Jugend was founded on Hoher Meissner in October 1913 on the basis of autonomy from adult supervision.

The Jung-Wandervögel also became known for the prevailing homosexuality in their ranks. According to historian Peter Stachura however, if male eroticism "did play some part in the ordinary day-to-day life of the Wandervögel, [...] it would be misleading to conclude on this account that the Wandervogel was a predominantly homo-erotic movement".

WWI and after (1914–1933)

After the Nazi seizure of power
From 1933, the Nazis outlawed the Wandervogel, German Scouting, the Jungenschaft, and the Bündische Jugend, along with most youth groups independent of the Hitler Youth. Only Church-affiliated groups survived, lasting until almost 1936.

Austria and Switzerland 
The Austrian wing, Österreichischer Wandervogel (ÖWV), was established in 1909 by a student from Prague, Hans Moutschka, following first contacts between the Austrian youth and German Wandervögel in Bohemia by 1906. Recruited within the Austrian bourgeoisie, its members were known for their violent rhetoric, and defended German nationalism against the perceived threat of pan-Slavism in Austria-Hungary.

Another branch was created in Switzerland in 1906-1907 after a meeting with German students opposed to alcohol, the Schweizerischer Wandervogel (SWV). They had 50 members at their launch in April 1908, and around 1,500 members in 1913. The Swiss movement had a limited impact, and was essentially composed of young German-speaking Protestants from the bourgeoisie.

Japan 
The first WanderVogel student club was created in 1935 in Rikkyo University. It then spread to Keio University and Meiji University, and from 1937 on to several other universities around the country, especially after World War II, in the context of high economic growth and popularization of mountaineering.

Sociology 
The movement was mostly based on the German Protestant middle class, attracting only a few working-class and aristocrat members. Boys and girls were allowed to join, although this caused some controversy among leaders, and the introduction of gender separation in the movement activities. Members were between 12 and 18 years old.

The regions with the largest concentration of Wandervögel were Silesia, Saxony, Thuringia, Hesse, Westphalia, Rhineland; and to a lesser extent Baden. They were largely present in Protestant regions; nearly 80% of the cities hosting a Wandervogel group in 1912 had a strong Protestant majority. Most of those locations were not densely populated and industrialized centres of life, but rather belonged to the rural and traditional part of Germany, with small and medium cities, residential suburbs, university cities, and capitals of small principalities.

The Wandervögel seem to have started an anti-authoritarian rebellion against German society at large, with their focus on the youth values in opposition to the adult ones. The movement was born in Steglitz, a middle-class residential neighbourhood of Berlin. Far from the agitation of the city centre and the working-class districts, young students wanted to escape the social constraints of their environment, which was built on traditional and hierarchical social ranks influencing relations with their parents and the adult society, rather than on poor material conditions. However, the Wandervogel was not a revolutionary movement in the real sense of the term, as they simply withdrew from society in order to carry out their activities in isolation during a few days or a whole summer, before returning to their usual life during the remaining part of the year. Although it could promote anarchist or nihilistic ideas at the margins, especially in the Jung-Wandervogel, most of the Wandervögel essentially sought to be seen as a respectable movement in wider society.

Modern aspects
The Wandervogel movement was refounded after World War II and exists in Germany to this day with around 5,000 members in many different associations, as well as in neighboring countries.

In Japan, it is now a fairly renowned student club with activities like mountaineering, sawanobori and ski touring.

Influence

Some authors have seen the ethos and activities of the Wandervogel as an influence on later social movements, in particular the hippie movement which developed in the United States during the 1960s.

See also

Flâneur
Mopery
Vogelfrei

References

Citations

Bibliography

Further reading

External links

 www.wandervogel.de — Common webportal of most present day Wandervogel associations

German Youth Movement
German words and phrases
1890s neologisms